Étalle may refer to:
 Étalle, Belgium, a municipality in the province of Luxembourg, Belgium
 Étalle, Ardennes, a commune of the Ardennes département, France